Habtamu Tekeste (born 11 September 1998) is an Ethiopian professional footballer who plays as an midfielder for the Ethiopian club Fasil Kenema, and the Ethiopia national team.

International career
Tekeste made his international debut with the Ethiopia national team in a 2–3 friendly loss to Zambia on 22 October 2020.

Honours
Fasil Kenema
Ethiopian Premier League: 2020–21

References

External links
 
 

1998 births
Living people
Ethiopian footballers
Ethiopia international footballers
Ethiopian Premier League players
Association football midfielders
Fasil Kenema S.C. players